Axelle Klinckaert (born 28 May 2000) is a Belgian artistic gymnast.  She was all the all-around silver medallist at the 2015 European Youth Summer Olympic Festival. She also won gold medals at the New Gymnastics Venue.

Competitive history

References

2000 births
Living people
Belgian female artistic gymnasts
People from Dendermonde
Belgian women gymnasts
Sportspeople from East Flanders